Aspergillus europaeus (also referred to as A. sauternesii) is a species of fungus in the genus Aspergillus. It is from the Cremei section. The species was first described in 2016. It has been reported to produce sulochrins and bianthrons.

References 

europaeus
Fungi described in 2016